Ramleh-ye Olya (also Romanized as Ramleh-ye ‘Olyā; also known as Ramleh, Ramleh-ye Bālā, and Ramlem-ye ‘Olyā) is a village in Abdoliyeh-ye Gharbi Rural District, in the Central District of Ramshir County, Khuzestan Province, Iran. At the 2006 census, its population was 51, in 9 families.

References 

Populated places in Ramshir County